Humaira Tasneem (born 8 June 1995) is a women's cricketer who plays for the United Arab Emirates national cricket team. In July 2018, she was named as the captain of the United Arab Emirates' squad for the 2018 ICC Women's World Twenty20 Qualifier tournament. She made her Women's Twenty20 International (WT20I) for the United Arab Emirates against the Netherlands in the World Twenty20 Qualifier on 7 July 2018.

Early and personal life
Tasneem was born in Al Ain to Indian parents from Hyderabad who had settled in Sharjah and grew up playing basketball and cricket with her siblings. She did her schooling from DPS, Sharjah and attended the American University of Sharjah.

International career
Tasneem played domestic cricket in the UAE and eventually debuted for her country at the age of 13 in 2008 on the tour to Thailand. She also led the UAE U19 team in the Asia Cricket Council (ACC) Under-19 Women's Cup held in Kuwait in 2012. 

Tasneem was selected in the United Arab Emirates' squad for the 2018 ICC Women's World Twenty20 Qualifier tournament and played her senior debut Women's Twenty20 International (WT20I) match for the United Arab Emirates against the Netherlands  on 7 July 2018. She became UAE's youngest captain at the age of 23 and also won her debut match as the captain of the national team.

References

External links
 

1995 births
Living people
People from Al Ain
Emirati women cricketers
United Arab Emirates women Twenty20 International cricketers
Women cricket captains
Indian expatriate sportspeople in the United Arab Emirates
People from the Emirate of Sharjah
American University of Sharjah alumni